An insectarium is a live insect zoo, or a museum or exhibit of live insects.  Insectariums often display a variety of insects and similar arthropods, such as spiders, beetles, cockroaches, ants, bees, millipedes, centipedes, crickets, grasshoppers, stick insects, scorpions, mantises and  woodlice.  Displays can focus on learning about insects, types of insects, their habitats, why they are important, and the work of entomologists, arachnologists, and other scientists that study terrestrial arthropods and similar animals.

Overview
Some insectariums may include museum displays of mounted insects and exhibits about insects.

A butterfly house is a type of insectarium that specializes in live butterflies and moths.  In addition, there are seasonal butterfly gardens on display at many zoos, botanical gardens, nature centers, natural history museums, and science museums.

List of insectariums
Public insectariums or insect zoos include:

Africa 
 Algiers Insectarium, Algiers, Algeria

Asia 
 Bangkok Butterfly Garden and Insectarium, Bangkok, Thailand
 Entopia (formerly Penang Butterfly Farm),(Penang, Malaysia)
 Gunma Insect World, Kiryū, Gunma, Japan
 Insect Science Museum, Taipei, Taiwan

Australia 

 Insectarium of Victoria, (Victoria, Australia)

Europe 

 Insektariumas (Lithuania, Palanga)
 Stratford Butterfly Farm, Stratford-upon-Avon, England
 Esapolis, The largest insectarium in the province of Padova, Padova, Italy

North America

Canada 

Lyman Entomological Museum, Quebec, Canada
 Montreal Insectarium, Montréal
 Newfoundland Insectarium, Reidville, Newfoundland

 Victoria Bug Zoo, Victoria, BC Canada
 Victoria Butterfly Gardens, Victoria, BC, Canada

United States 
 Audubon Insectarium, New Orleans, Louisiana

 Bayer Insectarium at the Museum of Life and Science, Durham, North Carolina
 Bohart Museum of Entomology, Davis, California
Cincinnati Zoo and Botanical Garden, World of the Insect, Cincinnati, Ohio
 Dancing Wings Butterfly Garden, Strong National Museum of Play, Rochester, New York
 Henry Doorly Zoo, Butterfly and Insect Pavilion, Omaha, Nebraska
 Houston Museum of Natural Science, Brown Hall of Entomology, Houston, Texas
 Insect Adventure, Stillwater, Oklahoma
 Butterfly Biosphere Thanksgiving Point, Lehi, Utah 
 The Insectarium, Philadelphia, Pennsylvania
 Monsanto Insectarium at the St. Louis Zoo, St. Louis, Missouri
 O. Orkin Insect Zoo at the National Museum of Natural History, Washington, D.C.
 Natural History Museum of Los Angeles County, Ralph M. Parsons Discovery Center and Insect Zoo, Los Angeles, California
 San Francisco Zoo, InsectZoo, San Francisco, California
 Detroit Zoo, Wildlife interpretive gallery (aviary, and butterfly garden), Detroit, Michigan
 Long Island Exhibition Center

See also
Formicarium